Rayannapalem is a village in Eluru district of the Indian state of Andhra Pradesh. It is located in Pedavegi mandal of Eluru revenue division, about 11 miles from Eluru. The nearest railway station is POWERPET railway station and ELURU railway station located at a distance of more than 10 Km.

Demographics 
As of 2011 census of India, Rayannapalem has a population of 4,758 of which 2,382 are males and 2,376 are females.

References

Villages in Eluru district